B. N. Chandrappa is an Indian politician and member of Parliament in 16th Lok Sabha from the Chitradurga (Lok Sabha constituency).

Early life and background 
Chandrappa was born to Nagappa and Lakshmamma on 01 October 1955 in Lakkavalli town of Chikkamagaluru district.

B. N. Chandrappa completed M.A. (Sociology), Educated at C.V. Raman University, Karnataka.

Personal life 
Chandrappa married Dr. S.T. Kavya on 01 Mar 1992. The couple has 1 son and 1 daughter.

Position held

References 

India MPs 2014–2019
People from Chitradurga district
Lok Sabha members from Karnataka
Living people
Indian National Congress politicians from Karnataka
1955 births